Through the Glass is an extended play by Australian alternative rock band Atlas Genius. It was released on 12 June 2012 by Warner Bros. Records.

Track listing

Release history

References

2012 debut EPs
Atlas Genius EPs
Warner Records EPs